The Ha Chhu (also spelled Haa Chhu) is a river in west-central Bhutan, it is a tributary of the Raidak River (Wong Chhu).

Course
The Ha Chhu originates in a valley glacier on the south facing slope of the main Himalayas. The source area is located to the south of Chomo Lhari (Mountain of the Goddess). A number of smaller streams flowing from glaciers in hanging valleys join the main stream. The Ha Chhu then flows in a general direction, south south-east to join the Wong Chhu at Chukho.

Ha valley

The upper valley of Ha Chhu is glaciated but in its lower and middle course it flows along a deep V-shaped valley. There are many rocky outcrops along this river.

The Ha valley is situated on Bhutan’s border with China,  from Paro. The mountain pass offers views of surrounding peaks and the Paro and Ha valleys.

Bulk of the Ha Chhu catchment is under alpine, sub-alpine and temperate mixed coniferous forests.

Ha village
Ha is a large village that has come up along this river. Situated at a steep drop of the river, it has a fort. It has retained the traditional Bhutanese style of architecture.

Lhakhang Karpo
Lhakhang Karpo is the main seat of Ha’s guardian deity – Ap Chundu.

Fish culture
Traditionally salmonidae (Salmo trutta) and Dinnawah snowtrout (Schizothorax progastus) was found in the Ha Chhu. Brown trout (Salmo trutta fario) was first introduced in Bhutan in 1930. A hatchery was established at Ha immediately thereafter and another at Wangchutaba in 1975. The asla is held in high esteem by the Bhutanese and brown trout seems to be feeding on and suppressing indigenous cold-water fish such as the asla. In 1987, the FAO fact finding and project idea formulating mission for small-scale cold-water fisheries visited Bhutan. A subsequent visit by experts established that the Ha hatchery was more conducive to fish culture than that in the foothill ponds.

References

Rivers of Bhutan